is a draft of an amendment to the constitution of the Empire of Japan released by the Japanese Communist Party on 29 June 1946. This draft was published during a lively discussion on the legislation of the Japanese Constitution after the Pacific War.

The characteristics of the draft are the abolition of the Japanese Imperial system, the adoption of  republicanism and democratic centralism, and the introduction of socialist policies.

External links
 Draft Constitution of People's Republic of Japan 

Politics of Japan
Republicanism in Japan
1946 in Japan
Provisional constitutions
Communism in Japan
Japanese Communist Party
1946 documents
1946 in Japanese politics